Birney Maries Jarvis was a member of the Wisconsin State Assembly.

Biography
Jarvis was born on June 27, 1845 in Africa, Ohio. During the American Civil War, he served with the 23rd Wisconsin Volunteer Infantry Regiment of the Union Army. Engagements he took part in include the Battle of Grand Gulf, the Battle of Port Gibson, the Battle of Jackson, Mississippi, the Battle of Champion Hill, the Battle of Big Black River Bridge, the Siege of Vicksburg and the Battle of Spanish Fort.

Assembly career
Jarvis was a member of the Assembly in 1881. He was a Republican.

References

People from Delaware County, Ohio
People from Richland Center, Wisconsin
People from Cazenovia, Wisconsin
Republican Party members of the Wisconsin State Assembly
People of Wisconsin in the American Civil War
Union Army soldiers
1845 births
Year of death missing